North Shore Senior High School is a secondary school located in unincorporated Harris County, Texas, United States in Greater Houston. The school includes grades 9 through 12 on three campuses, and is part of the Galena Park Independent School District (GPISD).

In 2019, the school was given an Overall Accountability Rating of 'B' by the Texas Education Agency, with distinctions earned for ELA/Reading, Mathematics, Social Studies, and Comparative Academic Growth.

The 9th Grade Campus/old campus is in the Cloverleaf CDP.

History 

North Shore opened in fall 1962 with grades 10–11 at a time when 9th grade students were typically located at junior high schools in Texas. In May 1965, the school graduated its first class of seniors that had spent all three years at North Shore. The original campus retained grades 9 and 10, and grades 11 and 12 moved to the new campus. In 2008 grade 10 was moved to the newer campus, and the original location became the North Shore 9th Grade Center. In 2018, the school separated the 10th grade students into the then new North Shore 10th Grade Center. 

 the two campuses combined had 4,775 students, making it the largest high school by student population in Greater Houston as well as the largest in the Texas Education Agency (TEA) Education Service Center Region 4.

Athletics 
North Shore's sports teams are the Mustangs, and they compete in the following UIL sports:

Boys Teams
 Baseball
 Basketball
 2018-2019 Class 6A State Semi-Finalist
 2013-2014 Class 5A State Champion
 1996-1997 Class 5A State Runner-Up
 1990-1991 Class 5A State Semi-Finalist
 Football
 2022 Class 6A/Division 1 State Runner-Up
 2021 Class 6A/Division 1 State Champion
 2019 Class 6A/Division 1 State Champion
 2018 Class 6A/Division 1 State Champion
 2015 Class 6A/Division 1 State Champion
 2003 Class 5A/Division 1 State Champion
 Soccer
 Tennis
 Track & Field
 2010-2011 Class 5A State Champion
 2009-2010 Class 5A State Champion
 Water Polo
 swimming
 Wrestling

Girls Teams
 Basketball
 2015-2016 Class 6A State Semi-Finalist
 Soccer
 Softball
 Track & Field
 Volleyball
 Water Polo
 swimming

Fine Arts
North Shore Senior High School has several fine arts programs such as band and percussion, choir, theater, dance, cheer, drill team (Scarlets), Colorguard, and art

Band

The North Shore Senior High School Marching Band enrolls over 300 ninth through twelfth grade students every year and is one of the largest organizations on campus. The band has received 40 consecutive UIL Sweepstakes awards, many Best in Class recognitions, and has advanced to the Texas State Marching Band Championships six times. In 2016, the band was a State Finalist and UIL Area F Champion. In the spring, students perform in one of the five concert bands: Cadet Band, Concert Band, Philharmonic Band, Symphonic Band, and the Wind Ensemble. The North Shore concert bands have all consistently earned sweepstakes awards at the UIL Concert and Sight Reading events. In addition to their involvement in the concert bands, each student must participate in the Texas Music Educators Association's Region, Area, and All-State band and orchestra performances and the GPISD Solo & Ensemble Contest. In 2017, the North Shore Senior High School Wind Ensemble was invited to perform at The Midwest International Band and Orchestra Conference in Chicago, Illinois.

Choir

The North Shore choir consists of  9 ensembles, 8 of which go to the UIL contest and are consistent sweepstakes winners. The Chamber Choir is made up of the most elite Chorale members.  The Chamber group is a consistent participant of the Madrigal Festival in San Antonio.

Colorguard

 The North Shore Colorguard performs with the Marching Band in the fall and does an ensemble in the winter and spring. The Winter Guard is under the direction of Mr. Bucky Flores. The Guard is a consistent top finisher at Texas Color Guard Circuit events and is the 2015 TCGC Scholastic silver medalist. They also perform in the GPISD Solo and Ensemble contest at the end of the school year.

Percussion

In addition to being a part of concert ensembles, percussion students are also in the Indoor Drumline. The North Shore Senior High School Drumline is under the direction of Jay Davis. The ensemble is a two-time Winter Guard International Scholastic World finalist and seven-time Texas Color Guard Circuit Scholastic World state champion.

Notable alumni
Dorance Armstrong Jr. — Professional football player in the NFL.
Brian Bohanon — Former professional baseball pitcher in MLB.
Tiffany Bolton — Actress, model, and television personality.
Chykie Brown — Former professional football player in the NFL.
John Bundrick — Musician and keyboardist for The Who.
K'Lavon Chaisson — Professional football player in the NFL.
Matt Conerly — Former professional football player in the NFL, Arena Football and the Norwegian American Football Federation.
Emeke Egbule — Professional football player in the NFL.
Zach Evans — American football running back for the Ole Miss Rebels.
Lance Gunn — Former professional football player in the NFL and NFL Europe.
Andre Gurode — Former professional football player in the NFL.
Trey Hopkins — Professional football player in the NFL.
Raúl Márquez — Former U.S. Olympic and professional boxer.
Akili McDowell — Actor.
Earl Mitchell — Professional football player in the NFL.
Johnathan Motley — Professional basketball player in the NBA.
Jamal Perry — NFL player for the Miami Dolphins
Lexi Randall — Former child actor in films and television.
Kirk Jerel Randle — Better known by his stage name Kirko Bangz. Rapper, singer, songwriter and record producer.
Cory Redding — Former professional football player in the NFL.
Kevin Rutland — Former professional football player in the NFL and CFL.
Joe Stephens — Former professional basketball player in the NBA. Currently a Harris County Justice of the Peace.
Najee Toran — Professional football player in the NFL.
DeAndrew White — Professional football player in the NFL.

References

External links
North Shore High School
9th Grade Center
10th Grade Center

Galena Park Independent School District high schools
Public education in Houston

Educational institutions established in 1962